The Australian National Road Race Championships, are held annually with an event for each category of bicycle rider: Men, Women & under 23 riders. The event also includes the Australian National Time Trial Championships since 2002. The Australian Championships were officially known as the Scody Australian Open Road Cycling Championships from 1999 to 2010, taking the name of their main sponsor. This changed to the Mars Cycling Australia Road National Championships from 2011 but they are more commonly referred to as The Nationals. The under 23 championships were introduced in 2001. Note that these results do not currently include the senior and junior amateur road race championships that were held prior to the open era.

The winners of each event are awarded with a symbolic cycling jersey featuring green and yellow stripes, which can be worn by the rider at other road racing events in the country to show their status as national champion. The champion's stripes can be combined into a sponsored rider's team kit design for this purpose.

Riders attended from all over Australia and New Zealand. From 1902 the fastest NSW rider in the Goulburn to Sydney Classic was selected to appear for NSW. In 1927 the Warrnambool to Melbourne was replaced by the Dunlop Grand Prix, a  race over four stages. In 1934 the Warrnambool to Melbourne was again replaced by a stage race, the Centenary 1000, a 1,102 miles (1,773 km) race over seven stages. From 1947 to 1949 the title of long distance road champion of Australia was awarded at a sprint point  into the Warrnambool to Melbourne Classic. In 1950 the first separate event was held at Cronulla, New South Wales.

The women's event was first held in 1978.

Multiple winners

Men 

Women

Elite

Men

Women

Under 23

Men

Women

Junior / Under 19

Men

Women

See also
Australian National Time Trial Championships
Australian National Criterium Championships
National Road Cycling Championships

Notes

References

External links
Men's results on cyclebase.nl
Individual Cyclist profiles at cycling.org.au
The Cycling website database

Cycle racing in Australia
National road cycling championships
Cycling
Recurring sporting events established in 1901